"Pool Hall Blues" is a 1990 episode of the American science fiction television series Quantum Leap. Lead character Sam Beckett "leaps" (travels through time) into the body of an African American man in 1954: Charlie "Black Magic" Walters, one of the (fictional) greatest pool players in America, and a childhood mentor of supporting character Al. Beckett as Walters must help Walters's granddaughter keep her Chicago nightclub and rescue it from under the corrupting influence of a criminal loan shark. The episode, the 18th of season 2, was written by Randy Holland and directed by Joe Napolitano. It originally aired on March 14, 1990. The episode won the series its second of three consecutive Primetime Emmy Awards for Outstanding Cinematography.

Plot
It is September 4, 1954 in  Chicago, Illinois, and Sam Beckett has "leaped" into the body of pool hustler Charlie "Black Magic" Walters, a former mentor of Al Calavicci.  Magic's granddaughter, Violet, has borrowed money from a loan shark to convert an old pool hall into a blues nightclub.  Unfortunately, disreputable pool hustler Eddie Davies has purchased the note for Violet's loan from the loan shark and is using it to goad Magic into a series of games of pool, threatening to take over the nightclub if Magic refuses.  Unable to obtain a bank loan to purchase the note, Sam agrees to the match, with Ziggy providing Sam (who has no clue how to play pool) with guidance to allow him to play at Magic's level.  Despite Eddie's interference - including having his henchman destroy Magic's beloved cue stick, Alberta - and the loss of Ziggy's guidance at a critical point in the match, Sam defeats Eddie and wins the note.

Cast
The principal cast of the episode were:
 Scott Bakula as Dr. Sam Beckett
 Dean Stockwell as Admiral Al Calavicci
 Alton Blair Carter as Lester Brown
 Ken Foree as The Brush
 Robert Gossett as Charles Griffin
 Shari Headley as Violet Walters
 J. W. Smith as Eddie Davies
 Annie Waterman as Miss White
 Theodore Wilson as Jimmy Grady
 Robert "Rags" Woods as Charlie "Black Magic" Walters

Awards
"Pool Hall Blues" won the 1990 Primetime Emmy Award for Outstanding Cinematography, for the camera work of Michael W. Watkins. The series had won the 1989 Emmy for Outstanding Cinematography (Roy H. Wagner, pilot episode "Genesis"), and would three-peat when it also won the 1991 Emmy (Watkins, season 3 episode "The Leap Home (Part 2) – Vietnam").

References

External links
 

1990 American television episodes
Emmy Award-winning episodes
Quantum Leap
Cue sports on television